These are the complete Grand Prix racing results of Renault as a constructor.

Complete Formula One results

As a constructor

Turbo era (1977–1985)
(key)

Return and first titles (2002–2009)
(key)

Genii Capital management (2010–2011)
(key)

Second return (2016–2020)
(key)

Notes
 † – The driver did not finish the Grand Prix, but was classified, as he completed over 90% of the race distance.

As an engine supplier

References



Formula One constructor results
Renault in Formula One